The Hours of Peter II is an illuminated book of hours completed in Paris in 1455-57 for Peter II, Duke of Brittany, following the Nantes liturgy. It contains 50 miniatures as well as vignettes in its margins. It is now in the Bibliothèque nationale, Paris.

References 

15th-century illuminated manuscripts
Peter 02
Bibliothèque nationale de France collections